Janikowo   is a town located in Inowrocław County, Kuyavian-Pomeranian Voivodeship, Poland. It has a population of 5111 (2004).

Sport 
 Unia Janikowo - football club

Cities and towns in Kuyavian-Pomeranian Voivodeship
Inowrocław County
Poznań Voivodeship (1921–1939)
Pomeranian Voivodeship (1919–1939)